The 2021–22 WE League, also known as the 2021–22 Yogibo WE League (Japanese: 2021–22 Yogibo WEリーグ, Hepburn: 2021–22 Yogibo WE Rīgu) for sponsorship reasons, was the 1st season of the WE League, the top Japanese women's professional league for association football clubs, since its establishment in 2020. The league began on 2 September 2021 and ended on 21 May 2022.

Organisation
The WE League is Japan's first fully professional women's soccer league, and 2021–22 is the WE League's inaugural season.

Competition

Preseason
Preseason ran from 24 April 2021 to 19 June 2021 prior to the Tokyo Olympics. In the first preseason match, INAC Kobe Leonessa defeated AC Nagano Parceiro 3–0.

Regular season
The regular season started on 12 September 2021 and finished on 21 May 2022.

Clubs

Stadiums and locations

Personnel and kits

Foreign players
The JFA subsidizes salaries for players from Southeast Asian member federations, while the league itself subsidizes players from top-ranked FIFA countries.

League table

Results

Positions by round

Results by round

All match results

Season statistics

Top scorers

Pre-season matches

Overview
 Source:
 Title: 2021 WE League pre-season matches
 Dates: 24 April – 19 June 2021
 Rules and regulations: match duration; 90 minutes (45 minutes each half)
 Number of matches: 22
 Official website: 2021 WE League pre-season matches

Results

See also

National association
Japan Football Association (JFA)
National league(s)
Nadeshiko League
National cup(s)
Empress's Cup
Nadeshiko League Cup
National team(s)
Japan women's national football team

References

External links

 Official website
 WE League data site

 Official website
 WE League data site

Japan
1
L
1
L
Japan